Zagożdżonka is a river of Poland. It flows into the Vistula near Świerże Górne.

See also
Krypianka

References

Rivers of Poland
Rivers of Masovian Voivodeship